Chris Sier is a professor at Newcastle University Business School. He has been appointed by the Financial Conduct Authority (FCA) to chair its working group on disclosure of costs and charges for institutional investors.

References

Living people
Year of birth missing (living people)
Academics of Newcastle University